Dialogues is a 1977 book in which Gilles Deleuze examines his philosophical pluralism in a series of discussions with Claire Parnet. It is widely read as an accessible and personable introduction to Deleuze's philosophy along with Negotiations. The book contains an exposition of Deleuze's concepts and methodologies in which he thinks of newer ways to liberate life.

The book has been translated into English by Hugh Tomlinson and Barbara Habberjam.

The Continuum and Columbia University Press editions have the brief essay "The Actual and the Virtual" in which Deleuze outlines an ontology of the virtual.

Editions 
Deleuze, Gilles and Claire Parnet (2007). Dialogues. New York: Columbia University Press

Further reading
Reading Guide to Dialogues

1977 non-fiction books
French non-fiction books
Works by Gilles Deleuze